List of all members of Stortinget (the Norwegian Parliament) in the period 1997 to 2001.  The list includes all those elected to Stortinget.

There were a total of 165 representatives, distributed among 65 to Norwegian Labour Party,
25 to Christian Democrats, 25 to Progress Party,
23 to Conservative Party, 11 to Centre Party, 9 to Socialist Left Party,
6 to Venstre and 1 to the Coastal Party.

The 8 Leveling seats went to Akershus (2), Hedmark (1), Hordaland (1), Oslo (2) and Rogaland (2).

Aust-Agder

Vest-Agder

Akershus

2 Leveling seats.

Buskerud

Finnmark

Hedmark

1 Leveling seat.

Hordaland

1 Leveling seat.

Møre og Romsdal

Nordland

Oppland

Oslo

2 Leveling seats.

Rogaland

2 Leveling seats.

Sogn og Fjordane

Telemark

Troms

Nord-Trøndelag

Sør-Trøndelag

Vestfold

Østfold

Valgte representatives:

 
 
Parliament of Norway, 1997-01